Nikesh Ram  is an Indian businessman and actor, who has appeared in Tamil and Malayalam language films. During August 2021, Ram was honored by the UAE government with the UAE Golden Visa for 10 years. Ram appeared in Khaleej Times BTR Magazine Cover Page as a successful businessman in UAE in Facility Management Industry.  He made his acting debut with Athithi a Tamil thriller movie.

Early and personal life
Ram graduated MBA from Madurai Kamaraj University, Madurai after completing his B.Com from Calicut University, Kerala. His father is a businessman in the Gulf region, and Ram has three younger sisters. After completing his MBA, he went to Kuwait to join his father's business. But, he preferred to work for few years, before joining the business. He was working for Le Meridien Kuwait, Yusuf Ahmed Al Ghanim, The White Stores, Ali Al Ghanim, Streamlink Communications Ltd (sub of Ali Alghanim) etc for his six years of professional life in Finance. While working, he completed the Certified Public Accountant (CPA) from USA. Later, he started Facilities Management business in Dubai in the year 2006. He is married to Sitara in 2005 and they have three children.

Acting career
Ram made his acting debut through his home production, Athithi directed by Bharathan. The film received mixed reviews and performed poorly at the box office, with his performance garnering mixed reviews. Deccan Chronicle noted "Debutant Nikesh Ram with his unkempt looks fits the bill and is convincing in a negative role". A reviewer from Behindwoods.com noted "Although the cause of his part is well served, spotting expressions in Ram's face seems to be a hard task". Silverscreen.com's reviewers wrote that Ram "looks the part in dark shirts, chinos and thick-rimmed glasses, but is unconvincing otherwise. His lines sound contrived and forced and don’t sound like someone trying to scare the daylights out of you".

Ram appeared in a cameo role in Vishnu's Velainu Vandhutta Vellaikaaran (2016) . His first Malayalam movie released on 25 May 2018 titled Mazhayathu directed by National Award winning director Suveeran. Ram is acting as hero in this movie along with actress Aparna Gopinath. The Times of India mentioned his acting as "Nikesh Ram puts on a decent performance as a stubborn husband and a doting dad". Mangalam News Paper said "Nikesh Ram did a good job and he could easily satisfy the role of Venugopal in the way it is required

Ram is simultaneously working as hero in an upcoming Tamil movie titled Michaelpatty Raja   directed by Francis S, who was an associate for Director S Shankar.

Filmography
All films are in Tamil, unless otherwise noted.

Awards and nominations

References

Indian male film actors
Male actors from Kannur
Living people
Male actors in Malayalam cinema
Male actors in Tamil cinema
1975 births
21st-century Indian male actors
Male actors from Kerala
Indian male actors
Male actors in Hindi cinema